Leanne and Naara is an indie pop/singer-songwriter duo based in Metro Manila, Philippines. The duo consists of Leanne Mamonong and Naara Acueza.

Although they began their musical careers while in their school, the duo began released their debut single "Again" in 2016, "New York and Back" in 2017, "Make Me Sing" and "Someday" in 2018, and "Destination" in 2019.

The duo is currently signed to Warner Music Philippines. They released their debut album Daybreak in 2020 with their leading single "Keeping Me Up".

History

Early years
Mamonong and Acueza had met each other in 2012 when they were both college freshmen at Assumption College San Lorenzo, taking Bachelor of Performance Arts course. The duo started their musical career when Mamonong was asked to perform at a school event, in which she was felt to be uncomfortable to do solo but decided to tapped in Acueza to accompany her. In the end, Acueza returned the favor to Mamonong to perform at the next school events.

In 2015, a few weeks before their graduation, the duo made their first gig at a local cafe in Bonifacio Global City owned by singer/artist and entrepreneur Miguel Escueta. They performed acoustic versions/covers of popular hits at the said place on a weekly basis.

Breakout artists (2016–2019)
In 2016, a year after their graduation, they composed and released their debut single "Again". It garnered 1 million streams for 2 months and earned top spots on Spotify's Philippines Viral 50 and other countries' charts and at #12 on Global Viral 50.

In 2018, the duo released their own version of Nina's 2006 hit "Someday", which became an instant hit on both radio and streaming platforms. They would later join the Elements Music Camp alongside Ben&Ben and Reese Lansangan.

In 2019, the duo officially signed under Warner Music Philippines.

Daybreak, new music (2020–present)
In 2020, the duo released their first studio album, Daybreak, consists of 8 tracks featuring their lead singles "Keeping Me Up" and "Who's Gonna Love You". The album was co-produced in collaboration with Sonic State Audio and London-based Chasing Fantasia. The album would later won for Best Album at the 34th Awit Awards.

In 2021, they released Daybreak (Live), a 13-track live album version of Daybreak including pre-2020 non-album singles accompanied by a recorded virtual concert, shot at the Maybank Theater's Globe Auditorium in BGC, Taguig. The virtual concert premiered on their official YouTube channel on September 4, 2021.

Members
Leanne Mamonong – vocals, keyboards
Naara Acueza – vocals, acoustic guitars

Discography

Studio albums

Live albums

Singles

As featured artists

Accolades

References

Filipino pop music groups
Musical groups from Metro Manila
Musical groups established in 2016
2016 establishments in the Philippines
Warner Music Philippines artists